Village of Bachevo is located in South-Western planning region of Bulgaria. It is part of 
Razlog Municipality, Blagoevgrad Province. 
Situated at South-western Bulgaria in the Razlog Valley (6 km. north-western from Razlog town, 52 km. south-eastern from Blagoevgrad city, and 156 km. south from capital Sofia), the name Bacheva (Бачева in Bulgarian) is first mentioned in 1576 in the 8th register of the dzhelepkeshans (shepherd).

References

Villages in Blagoevgrad Province